The LG Cup Egypt is an exhibition association football tournament that took place in Cairo, Egypt in 2001.

Participants
The participants were:

Results

Semifinals

Third place match

Final

Scorers
 1 goal
  Abdel Sattar Sabry
  Ahmed Salah Hosni
  Mohamed Barakat
  Mazhar Abdel Rahman
  Garret Kusch
  Ha Seok-ju
  An Hyo-yeon 
  Kim Do-hoon

See also
LG Cup

References

International association football competitions hosted by Egypt